Dawda Ceesay (born 25 January 1993) is a Gambian professional footballer who plays as a midfielder for Binh Duong in the V.League 1.

He played for Gambia U-17 in the 2009 FIFA U-17 World Cup.

Career
He has been a part of several Bangladesh Football Premier League clubs since 2014.

Churchill Brothers
In 2018 January he joined i-League side Churchill Brothers. He scored his first goal in i-League against Indian Arrows.

Minerva Punjab
On 15 July 2019, he joined Minerva Punjab.

Delhi FC
In 2021, Ceesay joined newly formed Minerva Delhi FC and appeared in the 130th edition of Durand Cup. He later appeared in the 2021 I-League Qualifiers, in which they finished on third position.

International career
He was a part of Gambia national under-17 football team which won 2009 African U-17 Championship. He scored a goal in the 20th minute against Cameroon U17 in the group stage of the tournament. He also played all three group stage matches for Gambia in the 2009 FIFA U-17 World Cup.

Career statistics

Club

Honours
Gambia U17
Africa U-17 Cup of Nations: 2009

References

External links
Dawda Ceesay stats at Football Critic

1993 births
Living people
Gambian footballers
Gambian expatriate footballers
Association football midfielders
I-League players
Saudi Second Division players
Al-Sadd FC (Saudi football club) players
Expatriate footballers in India
Expatriate footballers in Bangladesh
Expatriate footballers in Saudi Arabia
Gambian expatriate sportspeople in Bangladesh
Gambian expatriate sportspeople in Saudi Arabia
The Gambia youth international footballers
Feni SC players